The 1895 Baltimore Orioles season was a season in American baseball. The Orioles finished first in the National League, winning their second straight pennant. However, for the second straight year, they failed to win the Temple Cup, losing to the second-place Cleveland Spiders 4 games to 1.

Regular season

Season standings

Record vs. opponents

Roster

Player stats

Batting

Starters by position 
Note: Pos = Position; G = Games played; AB = At bats; H = Hits; Avg. = Batting average; HR = Home runs; RBI = Runs batted in

Other batters 
Note: G = Games played; AB = At bats; H = Hits; Avg. = Batting average; HR = Home runs; RBI = Runs batted in

Pitching

Starting pitchers 
Note: G = Games pitched; IP = Innings pitched; W = Wins; L = Losses; ERA = Earned run average; SO = Strikeouts

Other pitchers 
Note: G = Games pitched; IP = Innings pitched; W = Wins; L = Losses; ERA = Earned run average; SO = Strikeouts

References 
1895 Baltimore Orioles season at Baseball Reference
1895 Baltimore Orioles team page at www.baseball-almanac.com

Baltimore Orioles (1882–1899) seasons
Baltimore Orioles season
National League champion seasons